

Districts
Currently, the Union Territory of Andaman and Nicobar Islands comprises 3 districts:

History
On 1 August 1974 Nicobar district was separated from Andaman district. On 18 August 2006, Andaman district was bifurcated into two districts: North and Middle Andaman district and South Andaman district.

References

External links
 Andaman and Nicobar Islands website

 
Andaman and Nicobar Islands